The Rural Municipality of Carmichael No. 109 is a rural municipality (RM) in the Canadian province of Saskatchewan within Census Division No. 4 and  Division No. 3.

History 
The RM of Carmichael No. 109 incorporated as a rural municipality on December 9, 1912.

Geography

Communities and localities 
The following urban municipalities are surrounded by the RM.

Villages
Carmichael

The following unincorporated communities are within the RM.

Localities
Garden Head
Stone

Demographics 

Government 
The RM of Carmichael No. 109 is governed by an elected municipal council and an appointed administrator that meets on the second Wednesday of every month. The reeve of the RM is Jim Bradley while its administrator is Natasha Brown. The RM's office is located in Gull Lake.

Transportation 
Highway 1—serves Carmichael

See also 
List of rural municipalities in Saskatchewan

References 

C

Division No. 4, Saskatchewan